Crocosmia pottsii, Potts' montbretia, is a species of flowering plant in the family Iridaceae, native to KwaZulu-Natal and the southern Cape Provinces of South Africa, and introduced in Colombia. With Crocosmia aurea it is a parent of the widely cultivated Crocosmia × crocosmiiflora (the montbretia).

References

Iridaceae
Cormous plants
Garden plants of Southern Africa
Endemic flora of South Africa
Flora of the Cape Provinces
Flora of KwaZulu-Natal
Plants described in 1932